Maleh Dizgeh (also Romanized as Maleh Dīzgeh; also known as Maleh Dazgeh and Maleh Dezgeh) is a village in Dasht-e Zahab Rural District, in the Central District of Sarpol-e Zahab County, Kermanshah Province, Iran. At the 2006 census, its population was 129, in 32 families.

References 

Populated places in Sarpol-e Zahab County